The Hauz Khas metro station is an interchange station between the Yellow Line and the Magenta Line of the Delhi Metro. It serves Hauz Khas Enclave, Sarvapriya Vihar, Vijay Mandal Enclave, RBI colony, Mayfair Gardens and the IIT Delhi. The entrance to the station is located on Outer Ring Road, to the east of Aurobindo Marg and to the west of Khelgaon Marg.

At  underground, Hauz Khas is the deepest station in Delhi Metro. It has 23 escalators and 9 lifts.

Station

Station layout

Facilities
The station has the following facilities:

Token Vending Machine: One token vending machine near the frisking point
Toilet: 2 toilets- Both on the unpaid concourse
Shop/Office: Cashify, SBI Card, SIDBI, Pulse, two Food Track IRCTCs, SBI Card and WH Smith on the paid concourse
Medical/Health: Two first aid rooms on the paid concourse
Water: Pi-lo water ATM on the paid concourse
Travel: Yulu Bikes (electric bikes) at gate number 1's circulating area and Uber (cab facilities) at gate number 1's exit
Food/Restaurant: Munch with AVA near the Magenta Line station control room

Entry/Exits

Connections

Bus
DTC buses: DTC bus routes numbers 335, 344, 448, 448B, 448CL, 465, 503, 511, 511A, 512, 520, 542, 548, 548CL, 548EXT, 620, 764, 764EXT, 765, 774 AND 774B serve the station from nearby Sarvpriya Vihar bus stop.
Delhi Metro feeder buses:
Feeder bus service ML-72 starts from Hauz Khas metro station and ends at Chhattarpur metro station. It passes through the following bus stops: Vasant Kunj, Vasant Vihar Depot, Vasant Vihar, Munirka, Katwaria Sarai, Qutub Hotel, Adhchini and Hauz Khas.
Feeder bus service ML-73 starts from Hauz Khas metro station and ends at Badarpur Border metro station. It passes through the following bus stops: Panchsheel, Savitri Nagar, Swami Nagar, Chirag Delhi, Savitri Cinema, Chitranjanpark, DDA Flat, Tara Apartments, Sangam Vihar, Prahladpur and Badarpur.
Feeder bus service ML-80 starts from Hauz Khas metro station and ends at Okhla Dam. It passes through the following bus stops: Green Park, AIIMS metro station, South Ext., Lajpat Nagar, Ashram, Okhla Mor/Iswar Nagar, Holly Family and Jamia Millia Islamia.
Feeder bus service ML-87 starts from Nehru Place metro station and ends at Malai Mandir. It passes through the following bus stops: Savitri Cinema Mor, Masjid Mor, Chirag Delhi, Hauz khas Metro Station, Jia Sarai and Munirka.

See also

Hauz Khas
South Delhi
Delhi
List of Delhi Metro stations
Transport in Delhi
Delhi Metro Rail Corporation
Delhi Suburban Railway
Delhi Monorail
Delhi Transport Corporation
National Capital Region (India)
List of rapid transit systems
List of metro systems

References

External links

 Delhi Metro Rail Corporation Ltd. (Official site)
 Delhi Metro Annual Reports
 

Delhi Metro stations
Railway stations opened in 2010
Railway stations in South Delhi district
2010 establishments in Delhi